Cosmocalyx is a monotypic genus of flowering plants in the family Rubiaceae. The genus contains only one species, viz. Cosmocalyx spectabilis, which is found in Mexico, Belize, and Guatemala.

Description
After anthesis, one of the four calyx lobes expands into a reddish, leaf-like structure called a calycophyll. These facilitate dispersal of the fruit by wind. The fruit is a cylindrical indehiscent bilocular capsule. Each locule contains one basally inserted seed. This combination of characters distinguishes Cosmocalyx from other genera in Rubiaceae.

Systematics
Cosmocalyx was named by Paul Standley in 1930. The generic name is derived from the Ancient Greek words, kosmos, meaning "order", and kalyx, "a calyx".

Cosmocalyx is placed with Deppea, Hoffmannia, Hamelia and several other genera in the tribe Hamelieae. Relationships within this tribe are uncertain.

References

External links
Kew World Checklist of Selected Plant Families, Cosmocalyx spectabilis
Cosmocalyx At IPNI
Cosmocalyx At Biodiversity Heritage Library
Cosmocalyx At UniProt

Monotypic Rubiaceae genera
Hamelieae